This is a list of lighthouses in Angola.

Lighthouses

See also
List of lighthouses in the Republic of the Congo (to the north-west)
List of lighthouses in the Democratic Republic of the Congo 
List of lighthouses in Namibia (to the south)
 Lists of lighthouses and lightvessels

References

External links

Angola
Lighthouses
Lighthouses